The Cairo blind snake (Myriopholis cairi) is a species of nonvenomous snake in the family Leptotyphlopidae. The species is endemic to Africa.

Geographic range
M. cairi is found in Egypt, Eritrea, Ethiopia, Mauritania, Niger, Somalia, Sudan, Uganda, and possibly in Libya.

Etymology
The specific name, cairi, commemorates the city of Cairo, Egypt.

Habitat

Diet
M. cairi preys upon small invertebrates.

Reproduction
M. cairi is oviparous.

References

Further reading
Adalsteinsson SA, Branch WR, Trape S, Vitt LJ, Hedges SB (2009). "Molecular phylogeny, classification, and biogeography of snakes of the Family Leptotyphlopidae (Reptilia, Squamata)". Zootaxa 2244: 1-50. (Myriopholis cairi, new combination).
Boulenger GA (1893). Catalogue of the Snakes in the British Museum (Natural History). Volume I., Containing the Families Typhlopidæ, Glauconiidæ ... London: Trustees of the British Museum (Natural History). (Taylor and Francis, printers). xiii + 448 pp. + Plates I-XXVIII. (Glauconia cairi, pp. 65–66).
Duméril A-M-C, Bibron G (1844). Erpétologie générale ou Histoire naturelle complète des Reptiles, Tome sixième. Paris: Roret. xii + 609 pp. (Stenostoma cairi, new species, pp. 323–325). (in French).

Myriopholis
Reptiles described in 1844
Taxa named by André Marie Constant Duméril
Taxa named by Gabriel Bibron